Roztoky is a town in the Central Bohemian Region of the Czech Republic.

It may also refer to places:

Czech Republic
Roztoky (Rakovník District), a municipality and village in the Central Bohemian Region
Roztoky u Jilemnice, a municipality and village in the Liberec Region
Roztoky u Semil, a municipality and village in the Liberec Region

Slovakia
Roztoky, Svidník District, a municipality and village in the Prešov Region